Chakvi, also known as Chakva, is a resort town in Georgia by the Black Sea coast. It is part of Kobuleti Municipality.

Economy
Chakvi is known throughout Georgia as being the birthplace of tea production in Georgia. Chakvi was one of several tea producing areas that produced tea for the Soviet Union. Wild tea plants can still be found, and some limited tea production still continues, in the hills above Chakvi.

In July 2007 the $600,000 Chakvi radar station was constructed through oversight of the U.S. Army Corps of Engineers Europe District. It serves both the commercial and military port.

See also
 Adjara

References

External links

Cities and towns in Adjara
Populated places in Kobuleti Municipality
Populated coastal places in Georgia (country)